Stancil E. D. Johnson (1933–2021) was a psychiatrist and frisbee enthusiast.

He was a member of the International Frisbee Hall of Fame and the Disc Golf Hall of Fame.

He is considered a pioneer in competitive disc golf and the history of the sport. In 1975, he wrote Frisbee: Practitioner's Manual and Definitive Treatise. He is currently working on a book about disc golf.

Between 2000–2007, he was the first instructor at California State University, Monterey Bay (CSUMB) to teach a disc golf class.

In 2006, the inaugural West Coast College Open at CSUMB was held, and the tournament trophy presented to the winning team was named, "The Stancil Johnson Cup."

In 2009, the two disc golf courses at CSUMB were renamed "The Stancil Courses at CSU Monterey Bay, featuring Cypress and Oaks" in honor of his contributions.

He is quoted as having said, "When a ball dreams, it dreams it's a frisbee."

Notes

External links 
 International Frisbee Hall of Fame
 Disc Golf Hall of Fame
 CSUMB Disc Golf Club
 PDGA player page

American disc golfers
1933 births
2021 deaths
American psychiatrists
Place of birth missing
California State University, Monterey Bay